There are 2 genera of cacti named Pilocereus, but with different authorities:

Pilocereus K.Schum., a synonym of Pilosocereus
Pilocereus Lem., a synonym of Cephalocereus